There is also a Schuyler County, New York.

Schuyler is a town in Herkimer County, New York, United States. The population was 3,420 at the 2010 census. The town is in the western part of Herkimer County and is east of Utica.

History 

The area was first settled circa 1765. The town of Schuyler was formed in 1792 from part of the town of Herkimer. In 1797, part of Schuyler was taken to form the newer town of Trenton. Schuyler was further reduced in 1798 to form the town of Deerfield (Oneida County) and in 1806 to form the town of Newport.

Geography

The western town line is the border of Oneida County, and the southern town line is marked by the Mohawk River.

The New York State Thruway (Interstate 90) and the Erie Canal pass across the southern part of the town, and the Schuyler Travel Plaza is on the westbound side of the Thruway within the town.

Demographics

As of the census of 2000, there were 3,385 people, 1,418 households, and 937 families residing in the town.  The population density was 85.0 people per square mile (32.8/km2).  There were 1,541 housing units at an average density of 38.7 per square mile (14.9/km2).  The racial makeup of the town was 97.96% White, 0.50% African American, 0.03% Native American, 0.44% Asian, 0.06% Pacific Islander, 0.15% from other races, and 0.86% from two or more races. Hispanic or Latino of any race were 0.62% of the population.

There were 1,418 households, out of which 28.9% had children under the age of 18 living with them, 50.9% were married couples living together, 10.9% had a female householder with no husband present, and 33.9% were non-families. 28.4% of all households were made up of individuals, and 12.4% had someone living alone who was 65 years of age or older.  The average household size was 2.38 and the average family size was 2.93.

In the town, the population was spread out, with 23.8% under the age of 18, 6.5% from 18 to 24, 28.9% from 25 to 44, 25.3% from 45 to 64, and 15.5% who were 65 years of age or older.  The median age was 40 years. For every 100 females, there were 95.3 males.  For every 100 females age 18 and over, there were 90.9 males.

The median income for a household in the town was $35,375, and the median income for a family was $42,500. Males had a median income of $30,078 versus $22,407 for females. The per capita income for the town was $18,205.  About 6.4% of families and 9.4% of the population were below the poverty line, including 14.8% of those under age 18 and 9.1% of those age 65 or over.

Communities and locations in Schuyler, New York 
Baker Corners – A hamlet north of West Schuyler
Carey Corners – A location in the northeastern corner of the town
East Schuyler – A hamlet in the southeastern part of the town
Johnson Corners – A location northwest of East Schuyler
Minott Corners – A location near the eastern town line, north of Johnson Corners
Sheaf Corners – A location northwest of Johnson Corners
West Schuyler – A hamlet on Route 5 in the southwestern corner of the town
Windfall – A location northeast of Baker Corners

References

External links
 Town of Schuyler official website
  Early history of Schuyler, NY
 Early history (1869) of Schuyler, NY
Herkimer County Historical Society

Towns in New York (state)
Utica–Rome metropolitan area
Towns in Herkimer County, New York